The Treachery Act 1940 was an Act of the Parliament of the United Kingdom effective during World War II to facilitate the prosecution and execution of enemy spies, suspended afterwards, and repealed in 1968 or 1973, territory depending. The law was passed on 23 May 1940, in the month after Nazi Germany invaded France and Winston Churchill became prime minister.

Reasons for the Act
The Treachery Act was deemed necessary because treason still had its own special rules of evidence and procedure which made it a difficult offence to prove and prosecute (see Treason Act 1695). The newer offence, a felony, was designed to make convictions easier as it could be proved under the same rules of evidence as ordinary offences. It was also needed because there was doubt whether the treason laws were applicable to saboteurs.

In commending the Bill to the House of Commons, the Home Secretary, Sir John Anderson, explained why the law was necessary:

In the House of Lords the Lord Chancellor, Viscount Simon, elaborated:

The Act was always intended to be a temporary emergency measure which would be repealed after the War. It was rushed through Parliament in two weeks, passing the Lords in a few minutes and receiving royal assent on the same day.

Treachery and treason
The first section of the Treachery Act 1940 read:

Some argue that the Act could easily have replaced the current, ancient statutes that relate to and define treason. After the war people continued to be prosecuted under the Treason Act 1351 for disloyalty during the War.

Besides the laxer rules of procedure and evidence, the other main difference was the death sentence for treason was mandatory, whereas the death sentence for treachery could be commuted by the court under the Judgement of Death Act 1823. No sentences were commuted by the courts. One was commuted by the Home Secretary.

Extent

Breach of a duty of allegiance was not an element of treachery. Section 4 of the Act provided:

"Dominion" meant any Dominion within the meaning of the Statute of Westminster 1931, except Newfoundland, and included any territory administered by the Government as a Dominion (section 5(1)).

Uses of the Act
Between 1940 and 1946, 19 people were executed for treachery. The first British subject to be executed under the law was George Johnson Armstrong, who was hanged at HMP Wandsworth on 10 July 1941. German agent Josef Jakobs, the last person to be executed in the Tower of London, was tried by a military court and executed by firing squad under this law. Jakobs was the only one to be shot instead of hanged under the act, since he had been captured as an enemy combatant. The last person to be executed under the law—and the last person to be executed in the United Kingdom for an offence other than murder—was British soldier Theodore Schurch.

A 20th person, Portuguese diplomat Regério de Magalhaes Peixoto de Menezes, was sentenced to death, but had his sentence commuted by the Home Secretary, Herbert Morrison, to penal servitude for life. He was deported in 1949.

Suspension and repeal

The Treachery Act 1940 was brought into being for the duration of the "war emergency" (section 6). The Treason Act 1945 enabled treason to be proved with the normal rules of evidence, abolishing its special status. The Treachery Act was suspended on 24 February 1946, and was repealed in part  in 1968, and totally in 1973.

See also
Capital punishment in the United Kingdom
High treason in the United Kingdom
Defence of the Realm Act 1914
Emergency Powers (Defence) Act 1939
Defence Regulations

Further reading
Hansard (House of Commons), 9 May 1940, vol. 360, col. 1412 (presentation) 
Hansard (House of Commons), 22 May 1940, vol.361 col. 185 - 195, 195–235 (second and third reading)
Hansard (House of Lords), 23 May 1940, vol. 116, col. 391–398 (first, second and third reading)
Hansard (House of Commons), 23 May 1940, vol. 361, col. 362 – 363 (royal assent)

References

External links

Description of people executed under the Treachery Act
'Pathetic fantasist or Nazi spy'? – British newspaper advertorial promoting a newly published biography of the only woman to be convicted under the Act.

United Kingdom Acts of Parliament 1940
1940 in law
English criminal law
Treason in the United Kingdom
Emergency laws in the United Kingdom
United Kingdom in World War II
Repealed United Kingdom Acts of Parliament
World War II legislation